Danse avec lui is a French drama film directed by Valérie Guignabodet released in 2007 starring Mathilde Seigner and Sami Frey.

Plot 
Three years after a dramatic rupture and a serious horse fall that have deeply changed her life, Alexandra Balzan (Mathilde Seigner), a Parisian architect, learns again how to live and love after the emotional meeting of an old misanthrope equestrian (Sami Frey) and his horse, in an abandoned equestrian center in Beauvais.

Cast 
 Mathilde Seigner as Alexandra Balzan
 Sami Frey as The Horseman
 Jean-François Pignon as Miguel
 Anny Duperey as Alexandra's mother
 Anne Le Guernec as Alexandra's sister
 Anthony Delon as Paul Balzan
 Jean Dell as Daniel
 Élodie Navarre as Lucie
 Camille Varenne as Amélie
 Gilles Gaston-Dreyfus as the horseback riding teacher
 Quentin Grosset as the schoolboy

References

External links 

2007 films
2007 drama films
French drama films
Films about horses
2000s French films